The Diocese of Newcastle is a Church of England diocese based in Newcastle upon Tyne, covering the historic county of Northumberland (and therefore including the part of Tyne and Wear north of the River Tyne), as well as the area of Alston Moor in Cumbria (historic Cumberland).

The diocese came into being on 23 May 1882, and was one of four created by the Bishoprics Act 1878 (41 & 42 Vict. c. 68) for industrial areas with rapidly expanding populations. The area of the diocese was taken from the part of the Diocese of Durham which was north of the River Tyne, and was defined in the legislation as comprising:

The cathedral is Newcastle Cathedral (until 1882 the Parish Church of St Nicholas) and the diocesan bishop is Helen-Ann Hartley, Bishop of Newcastle.

Bishops
The diocesan Bishop of Newcastle is the ordinary of the diocese and is assisted by the Bishop of Berwick. Alternative episcopal oversight (for parishes in the diocese who reject the ministry of priests who are women) is provided by the provincial episcopal visitor (PEV) the Bishop suffragan of Beverley, Stephen Race. He is licensed as an honorary assistant bishop of the diocese in order to facilitate his work there.

On 28 November 2015, Frank White, then the full-time assistant bishop, presented a proposal to the Diocesan Synod (within which diocese Berwick now lies) to revive the abeyant Suffragan See of Berwick. The Dioceses Commission approved the petition to revive the See and Mark Tanner was consecrated Bishop of Berwick on 18 October 2016; he later vacated the post upon his translation to Chester. Mark Wroe, formerly Archdeacon of Northumberland, was consecrated as Bishop of Berwick on 5 January 2021.

Besides Race, there are five retired honorary assistant bishops licensed in the diocese:
2003–present: A retired Bishop suffragan of Bedford, John Richardson, lives in Bewcastle, Cumbria and is also licensed in Carlisle diocese.
2005–present: Stephen Pedley, retired Bishop suffragan of Lancaster, lives in Warden, Northumberland.
2014–present: Stephen Platten, Rector of St Michael Cornhill (Diocese of London) and retired Bishop of Wakefield (also in London and Southwark dioceses.)
2014–present: John Packer, Bishop of Ripon and Leeds and former Bishop suffragan of Warrington, retired in 2014 to Cullercoats.
2021–present: John Sentamu, former Archbishop of York

Archdeaconries and deaneries

Archdeacons 
On 8 November 2020, it was announced that the Archdeacon of Northumberland, Mark Wroe, was to become the Bishop of Berwick. Following his consecration 5 January 2021, Rachel Wood, vicar of St Mary's, Monkseaton, will also be the acting Archdeacon of Northumberland.

Catherine Sourbut Groves was collated as Archdeacon of Lindisfarne on 14 November 2020. Due to restrictions as a result of the COVID-19 pandemic, the service was conducted online.

*includes Cathedral

List of churches

Outside a deanery

Deanery of Bedlington

Deanery of Newcastle Central 

1Local ecumenical partnership (CoE/Baptist/Methodist/URC)

Deanery of Newcastle East

Deanery of Newcastle West

Deanery of Tynemouth

Deanery of Alnwick

Deanery of Bamburgh and Glendale

Deanery of Bellingham

Deanery of Corbridge

Deanery of Hexham

Deanery of Morpeth

Deanery of Norham

Dedications 
This table is drawn from the above lists.

References

Bibliography
Church of England Statistics 2002

External links
 

 
Newcastle
Newcastle upon Tyne